TGZ may mean:
.tgz file extension, which is equivalent to .tar.gz extension
Ángel Albino Corzo International Airport, in Tuxtla Gutierrez, Mexico (IATA airport code)